Todhunter is a surname of English origin. At the time of the British Census of 1881 Todhunter Surname at Forebears, its relative frequency was highest in Cumberland (59.9 times the British average), followed by the Isle of Man, Huntingdonshire, Cambridgeshire, Cheshire, Northumberland, Lancashire, Surrey, Essex, and County Durham.

Todhunter may also refer to:

 Charles Todhunter (1869–1949), civil servant
 Isaac Todhunter (1820–1884), English mathematician and author
 John Todhunter (1839–1916), Irish poet and playwright
 John A. Todhunter (born 1949), American government official in the EPA 1981–83
 Francis A. Todhunter (1884-1963), American commercial artist and landscape painter
 Winifred Todhunter (1877–1961), British educator; founder of the Todhunter School for Girls in New York City

See also
 Todhunter Ballard (1903–1980), author
 Mary Todhunter Rockefeller (1907-1999), First Lady of New York
 Thomas Todhunter Shields (1873–1955), pastor
 Rex Todhunter Stout (1886-1975), novelist